Miss United States 2014 is the 14th edition of the Miss United States beauty pageant. It took place in Washington, D.C. on July 4. It was won by a contestant from North Carolina, Elizabeth Safrit, who also became Miss World America 2014, after Miss United States acquired the license for Miss World in the US,  and was the 2nd runner-up of Miss World 2014 held during December 2014 in London. Safrit crowned her successors for
both Miss United States 2015 and Miss World America 2015 the following year.

References

External links 

 
 

Beauty pageants in the United States
2014 in the United States
United States
2014